The Pentax MX-1 is a digital compact camera announced on January 7, 2013.

References
http://www.dpreview.com/products/pentax/compacts/pentax_mx1/specifications

MX-1